This list is a discography of Los Prisioneros.

Studio albums
La voz de los '80 (1984)
Pateando piedras (1986)
La cultura de la basura (1987)
Corazones (1990)
Los Prisioneros (2003)
Manzana (2004)

Live albums
En Vivo.. Parque la Bandera (1988)
El Caset Pirata (2000)
Estadio Nacional (2002)
En Vivo (2002)

Compilations
Los Prisioneros (1988)
Grandes éxitos (1991)
Ni Por La Razón, Ni Por La Fuerza (1996)
Antología, su historia y sus éxitos (2001)
Músicos, poetas y locos (2003)

Specials
La cultura de la basura (1988)(Edición latinoamericana)
Los Prisioneros en las Raras Tocatas Nuevas de la Rock & Pop (2003)

Tribute
Tributo a Los Prisioneros (2000)

Singles
1984 - La voz de los '80
1985 - Sexo
1985 - Latinoamérica es un pueblo al sur de Estados Unidos
1985 - ¿Quién mató a Marilyn?
1985 - Paramar
1985 - Nunca quedas mal con nadie
1985 - Mentalidad televisiva
1986 - Muevan las industrias
1986 - El baile de los que sobran
1986 - Por qué no se van
1986 - Por qué los ricos
1986 - Independencia cultural
1986 - Estar solo
1986 - Quieren dinero
1986 - Exijo ser un héroe
1987 - Maldito sudaca
1988 - Lo estamos pasando muy bien
1988 - Que no destrocen tu vida
1988 - Pa pa pa
1988 - Él es mi ídolo
1988 - We are sudamerican rockers
1990 - Tren al sur
1990 - Estrechez de corazón
1990 - Corazones rojos
1990 - Con suavidad
1991 - Amiga mía
2001 - Las sierras eléctricas
2003 - Ultraderecha
2003 - San Miguel
2003 - Concepción
2003 - Canción del trabajo
2004 - El muro
2004 - Manzana
2004 - Eres mi hogar

Music videos

La Voz de los '80
La voz de los '80 (Two versions)
Sexo
Latinoamérica es un pueblo al sur de Estados Unidos
Paramar
Nunca quedas mal con nadie

Pateando Piedras
Muevan las industrias
El baile de los que sobran (Two versions)
¿Por qué no se van?
Quieren dinero

La Cultura de La Basura
Maldito sudaca
We are sudamerican rockers
Que no destruyan tu vida
Papapa
Lo estamos pasando muy bien
El es mi ídolo

Corazones
Estrechez de corazón
Tren al sur
Corazones rojos
Amiga mía

Ni por la razón, ni por la fuerza
El cobarde
Lo estamos pasando muy bien

El Caset Pirata
No necesitamos banderas (Live)

Estadio Nacional
¿Por qué no se van? (Live)
Quieren dinero (Live)

Los Prisioneros
San Miguel
Ultraderecha

Manzana
Manzana
El muro
Eres mi hogar

DVD
1992 - Grandes éxitos (VHS)music videos, documentaries and extras
2002 - Antología, su historia y sus éxitosmusic videos, documentaries and extras
2002 - Lo estamos pasando muy bienLive concert at the National Stadium

Discography
Discographies of Chilean artists